The 1975 Queen's Birthday Honours in New Zealand, celebrating the official birthday of Elizabeth II, were appointments made by the Queen on the advice of the New Zealand government to various orders and honours to reward and highlight good works by New Zealanders. They were announced on 14 June 1975.

The recipients of honours are displayed here as they were styled before their new honour.

Knight Bachelor
 Charles Moihi Te Arawaka Bennett  – of Maketu. For public services, especially to the Māori people.
 Frank Wakefield Holmes  – of Wellington; professor of money and finance, Victoria University of Wellington. For public services.

Order of the Bath

Companion (CB)
Military division
 Rear Admiral Edward Courtney Thorne  – Chief of Naval Staff.

Order of Saint Michael and Saint George

Knight Commander (KCMG)
 The Honourable Arnold Henry Nordmeyer   – of Wellington. For public services.

Companion (CMG)
 Ronald Keith Davison  – of Auckland. For public services.
 The Honourable William Arthur Fox – of Ōtaki. For public services.
 Jock Malcolm McEwen – of Heretaunga; lately Secretary of Maori Affairs.
 Andrew Gordon Robb – of Wellington. For public services.

Order of the British Empire

Knight Commander (KBE)
Civil division
 George Ernest Francis Wood  – of Whangārei. For public services, especially as chairman of the Consumer Council since 1959.

Commander (CBE)
Civil division
 George James Brocklehurst  – of Auckland. For services as New Zealand High Commissioner to the Cook Islands, 1972–1975.
 The Right Reverend John Tristram Holland – currently in England. For services as Bishop of Waikato, 1951–1969, and Bishop of Polynesia, 1969–1975.
 Michael Rotohiko Jones    – of Ōtorohanga. For services to the Māori people.
 Pérrine Moncrieff  – of Wakapuaka. For services to conservation as a naturalist and to the Abel Tasman National Park.
 Michael James Moriarty – of Wellington. For public services.
 Michael Bernard Scully – currently Chief Justice of Western Samoa; formerly of Wellington. For services as a stipendiary magistrate.

Military division
 Air Commodore Cyril Laurence Siegert  – Royal New Zealand Air Force; Assistant Chief of Defence Staff (Policy).

Officer (OBE)
Civil division
 Lewis George Anderson – of Lower Hutt; lately assistant director-general (social work), Department of Social Welfare.
 Dorothy Beatrice Campbell – of Taupō. For services as founder of the New Zealand Pony Clubs Association Incorporated.
 Harold Edward Coxhead – of Timaru. For services to the tourist and travel industry, especially as chairman of the Tourist Hotel Corporation.
 Walter Atcherley Dew – of Dannevirke. For services to local government and the woollen industry.
 Brenda Gardner – of Whangārei. For services to the community and nursing.
 Emma Potiki Grooby  – of Dunedin. For services to the community and Māori people.
 William James Henderson – of Wellington; chief fire service officer, New Zealand Fire Service Commission.
 Iris May, Lady Kitts – of Wellington. For services to the community as mayoress of the City of Wellington, 1956–1974.
 Clutha Nantes Mackenzie  – of Scargill, Christchurch. For services to local government.
 Juan Matteucci – of Auckland. For services to music.
 Frederick Walter Gascoyne Miller – of Invercargill. For services to the community and literature.
 Eric Alderson Missen – of Plimmerton; Secretary for Justice, 1970–1974.
 John Massy Stacpoole – of Auckland. For services to the preservation of historic buildings.
 Rewi Tamihana – of Petone. For services to the Māori people.
 Areginald James Waghorn  – of Wellington. For services to education and art.
 Cyril Charles William White – of Auckland. For services to the blind, especially the Royal New Zealand Foundation for the Blind.

Military division
 Colonel Charles Desmond Hall  – Colonels' List (Territorial Force), Headquarters Field Force Command, New Zealand Army.
 Group Captain Arthur Frederick Tucker  – Royal New Zealand Air Force.

Member (MBE)
Civil division
 Arthur Walter Baker – detective chief inspector, New Zealand Police.
 Douglas William Robert Blackler – of Invercargill. For services to the community.
 Thelma Heath Clough – of Auckland. For services to commercial education.
 Gerald Huntly Corrick  – of Feilding. For services to local government and community.
 Dorothy Ida Davies (Mrs Lochore)  – of Whangaparāoa. For services to music.
 Gar Leong Ding  – of Momona. For services to commercial horticulture and community.
 Jessie Edna Donald  – of Lower Hutt. For services to the community.
 The Reverend Wilfred Ernest Falkingham – of Christchurch. For services to social welfare.
 Arthur Stanley Fong – of Greymouth. For services to sport and community.
 George Joseph Kennedy Keown – of Wellington; Assistant Secretary of Mines, 1961–1975.
 Margaret Alexandrina Mackenzie – of Dunedin. For services to sport, especially netball.
 John Alexander McInnes – of Christchurch. For services to sport, especially wrestling.
 Wairemana Miriama Hohipera Pitama-Riwai – of Christchurch. For services to Māori culture.
 Constance Miriam Purdue – of Auckland. For community and public services.
 Richard James Rolfe – of Thames. For services as president of the New Zealand Trotting Conference, 1969–1974.
 Charles Edward Saunders  – of Blenheim. For services to rowing and the community.
 Professor Keith Westhead Thomson – of Palmerston North; professor of geography, Massey University. For services to the arts, education and community.
 Cissie Winstanley – of Napier. For services to bowling.

Military division
 Warrant Officer Physical Training Instructor Peter Joseph Allan – Royal New Zealand Navy.
 Temporary Major and Quartermaster Walter Fraser – Royal New Zealand Army Service Corps.
 Major Neville Sutcliffe Kidd – Royal New Zealand Infantry Regiment (Regular Force).
 Warrant Officer Second Class Richard Lindsay Pepper – Royal New Zealand Armoured Corps.
 Warrant Officer Second Class Ian Mac Stevenson  – Royal New Zealand Army Ordnance Corps (Territorial Force).
 Temporary Squadron Leader Terence John Kelly – Royal New Zealand Air Force.
 Flight Lieutenant Edward George Wright – Royal New Zealand Air Force.

British Empire Medal (BEM)
Civil division
 Russell Harris Broughton – of Masterton. For services to the community.
 Robert Laurie Butler – detective senior sergeant, New Zealand Police.
 William Peter Dawson  – of Dunedin. For services to the community.
 Keith Owen Evans – senior sergeant, New Zealand Police.
 Athol Charles Garlick – of Rotorua. For services to sport.
 Rebecca Annie Graham – of Whangaparāoa. For services to the community.
 Frederick Lionel Graham Howard – of Taihape. For services to the community.
 Wilfrid Christian Kohn – of Gisborne. For services to music.
 Ernest James Arthur Ormrod – of New Plymouth. For services to brass bands.
 John Hamilton Shortt – of Palmerston North. For services to the blind.
 Mary Gabrielle Smith – of Auckland. For services to the handicapped.
 Celia May Wilkins – of Pukerua Bay. For services to sport, especially women's hockey.

Military division
 General Dutyman Harry Robert Willis – Royal New Zealand Navy.
 Sergeant Allan John Brown – Royal New Zealand Engineers.
 Flight Sergeant William Leslie Grimes – Royal New Zealand Air Force.
 Flight Sergeant Eric James Taylor – Royal New Zealand Air Force.

Companion of the Queen's Service Order (QSO)

For community service
 Alison Gray Cathie – of Wellington. For services to nursing and the community.
 John Nesham Gordon – of Wellington. For welfare services.
 Hensleigh Carthew Marryat Norris – of Hamilton. For services to the community.
 Leonard Gordon Keith Steven  – of Christchurch. For services to the community, especially the Crippled Children's Society.

For public services
 The Honourable Raymond Boord – of Rotorua. For services to local government and community.
 Maida Jessie Clark  – of Wellington. For services to education and the community.
 Mervyn Henry Janes – of Wellington. For services as a private secretary to ministers of the Crown.
 Makere Rangiatea Ralph Love  – of Petone. For services to local-body affairs and the Māori people.
 David Gilmour McLachlan  – of Wellington. For services to medicine, in particular psychiatry.
 James Lister Newman – of Auckland. For services to the care of geriatrics.
 Alfred Raymond Perry – of Wellington; lately deputy Secretary of Labour.

Queen's Service Medal (QSM)

For community service
 Robert Wilfred Allum  – of Wellington. For services to the community.
 Frederick Walter Whitney Dawson – of Whangārei. For services to the community.
 Beatrice Mary Freeling – of Auckland. For services to the community.
 Phyllis Maude Hewstone – of Christchurch. For services to the community.
 Arthur Oliver Kempton – of Invercargill. For service to technical education.
 Ivy Clarissa Laidlaw – of Dunedin. For services to the community, in particular the Otago Old People's Welfare Council.
 Gwendoline Myrtle Audrey Le Verne – of Auckland. For welfare services.
 Marie Elizabeth Markwick – of Whangārei. For voluntary services to the community.
 Reitu Mary Robson – of Henderson. For welfare services.
 Thomas Romain – of Wellington. For welfare work.
 Andrew George Ross  – of Hastings. For services to the Intellectually Handicapped Children's Society.
 Norman George Stewart – of Dunedin. For services to disabled people.
 Lieutenant-Colonel Thomas Craig Wallace  – of Cambridge. For services to the community and returned servicemen.
 Herbert Walter Watson – of Renwick. For services to the community.
 Ellis John Wood  – of Ashburton. For services to the Boy Scout Association of New Zealand.

For public services
 Joyce Una Baker – of Ashhurst. For services to nursing.
 Adelaide Booth  – of Lower Hutt. For services to education.
 William George Caldwell – of Balclutha. For services to local-body affairs and community.
 John Francis Colvin  – of Te Atatū South. For service to local government and community.
 Keith Hall Eddy  – of Wainuiomata. For services to local-body affairs and community.
 Arthur Huia Honeyfield – of Katikati. For public services.
 Geoffrey Noel Jeffery  – of Roxburgh. For services to local government.
 Norman Philip Hastings Jones – of Invercargill. For services to civil defence and the community.
 Mary Rose Kinney – of Alexandra; postmistress at Chatto Creek, 1933–1975.
 Frederick Charles McGehan  – of Auckland. For services to local government and the community.
 Albert Edward Surtees Roberts – of Te Kaha. For services to local-body affairs and community.
 John Robert Scurr – of Wānaka. For services to local government.
 Claude Henry Shackell – of Timaru. For services to civil defence and the community.
 James Melville Stanley  – of Taupō. For services to local-body affairs.
 William Douglas Sullivan – of Lower Hutt; lately assistant director (management accounts), New Zealand Railways
 Violet May Tew – of Timaru. For services to nursing.
 Jean Evelyn Woodham  – of Christchurch. For services to local-body affairs and community.

Queen's Fire Service Medal (QFSM)
 David William Blewett – chief fire officer Alexandra Volunteer Fire Brigade.
 Bruce McKenzie Wallis – chief fire officer, Gore Volunteer Fire Brigade.

Queen's Police Medal (QPM)
 Henry John Forsey – lately constable, New Zealand Police.

Air Force Cross (AFC)
 Squadron Leader Noel James Stewart Rodger – Royal New Zealand Air Force.

Queen's Commendation for Valuable Service in the Air
 Flight Lieutenant Barry James Mitchell – Royal New Zealand Air Force.

References

Birthday Honours
1975 awards
1975 in New Zealand
New Zealand awards